Eaton is a village and civil parish in Nottinghamshire, England. According to the 2001 census it had a population of 105, increasing to 233 at the 2011 Census. It is located 2 miles south of Retford, on the A638 road.

All Saints' Church was completely rebuilt in 1860 in Decorated style.

Al Karam Secondary School was located in the village before its closure in 2014. It is now known as Jamia Al-Karam which now occupies the site.

References

External links

Villages in Nottinghamshire
Civil parishes in Nottinghamshire
Bassetlaw District